An Encyclopaedia of New Zealand is an official encyclopaedia about New Zealand, published in three volumes by the New Zealand Government in 1966. Edited by Alexander Hare McLintock, the parliamentary historian, assisted by two others, the encyclopaedia included over 1,800 articles and 900 biographies, written by 359 contributing authors.

The encyclopaedia is more comprehensive, and more representative of minorities, than previous New Zealand reference works, such as the vanity press The Cyclopedia of New Zealand published around sixty years earlier, but not as representative as the later Dictionary of New Zealand Biography. A number of women were included as representing firsts, including Kate Edger.

Its publication met with an enthusiastic response; within two months almost all of its initial print run of 34,000 copies had sold. After the last 3,000 copies sold, it was never reprinted, more due to the non-commercial priorities of the government-run printing office than any lack of demand or interest from the general public. The encyclopaedia was well received by scholars and teachers, and is still regarded as an important New Zealand reference work, even considering its errors and omissions, and the biases of its time. Jock Phillips, writing in 2003 about his editorship of its successor Te Ara: The Encyclopedia of New Zealand, considers it an "illustrious predecessor" and describes it as

The work's importance, both as a reference and as an historical snapshot of mid-20th century New Zealand, motivated the Ministry for Culture and Heritage to digitise and republish the work online. The text and images have been made available, without corrections or updates, as a separate resource within Te Ara: The Encyclopedia of New Zealand.

References

External links 
 An Encyclopaedia of New Zealand – digitised version at Te Ara

New Zealand
1966 in New Zealand
1966 non-fiction books
New Zealand encyclopedias
20th-century encyclopedias